United Haulers Ass'n v. Oneida-Herkimer Solid Waste Management Authority, 550 U.S. 330 (2007), was a United States Supreme Court case about interstate commerce.  Chief Justice John Roberts wrote the opinion of the Court, holding that New York county ordinances forcing private waste management companies to deliver waste to a public facility did not discriminate against interstate commerce.  Justice Samuel Alito wrote a dissent.

Background 
The plaintiff, United Haulers, a not-for-profit corporation made up of waste management companies, sued the New York counties of Oneida and Herkimer, which controlled the Oneida-Herkimer Solid Waste Management Authority, under 42 U.S.C. § 1983.  United Haulers claimed that county ordinances requiring all solid wastes and recyclables generated within the two counties to be delivered to one of several waste processing facilities owned by the Authority violated the Dormant Commerce Clause.

Procedural history
The district court ruled in favor of United Haulers, on the basis of the Supreme Court's holding in C&A Carbone, Inc. v. Town of Clarkstown, New York.  The Second Circuit Court of Appeals reversed, reasoning that the public benefit outweighed any restriction on interstate commerce.  United Haulers appealed, and the Supreme Court granted certiorari.

Decision

Issue
Does an ordinance requiring delivery of all solid waste to a publicly owned and operated local facility impose a substantial burden on interstate commerce and therefore violate the Commerce Clause?

Opinion of the Court
Chief Justice Roberts, writing for the Court, held that the law did not violate the dormant commerce clause.  

In Carbone v. Clarkstown, the Court struck down a similar flow control ordinance that forced haulers to deliver waste to a private processing facility.  Here, the Court held that because the facilities were owned and operated by a state-created public benefit corporation, the restriction was permissible.  "Disposing of trash," Roberts wrote, "has been a traditional government activity for years, and laws that favor the government in such areas— but treat every private business, whether in-state or out-of-state, exactly the same—do not discriminate against interstate commerce for purposes of the Commerce Clause."  Roberts applied the balancing test from Pike v. Bruce Church, Inc. to determine that the local benefits outweigh the interstate commerce concerns, but a majority of the court did not agree that applying the balancing test was necessary.

Scalia's concurrence
Justice Scalia agreed with the Court's holding, and wrote separately to restate his opinion that "the so-called 'negative' Commerce Clause is an unjustified judicial invention, not to be expanded beyond its existing domain."  Scalia also objected to the use of the Pike test.

Thomas's concurrence
Justice Thomas agreed with the Court's holding, and wrote separately to refute the majority opinion he had joined in C&A Carbone, Inc. v. Clarkstown, 511 U.S. 383 (1994) stating that, contrary to his position in Carbone, he now believes "the negative Commerce Clause has no basis in the Constitution and has proved unworkable in practice."

Dissent
Justice Alito, joined by Justices Stevens and Kennedy, dissented from the Court's holding, stating that the facts in this case did not differ enough from those in Carbone to justify the opposite result.

Notes

External links
 

United States Constitution Article One case law
United States Supreme Court cases
2007 in the environment
2007 in United States case law
United States Dormant Commerce Clause case law
United States Supreme Court cases of the Roberts Court
Oneida County, New York
Herkimer County, New York
Waste management in the United States